Joseph R. Bartlett (born December 30, 1969) is an American politician and real estate investor who served as a member of the Maryland House of Delegates for District 4A from 1999 to 2011.

Early life and education
Bartlett was born on December 30, 1969, in Takoma Park, Maryland, the son of then-future Congressman Roscoe Bartlett. Bartlett earned an Associate of Arts degree from Frederick Community College in 1992, followed by a Bachelor of Science degree in Business Administration from Frostburg State University in 1994.

Career 
In 1994 and 1996, Bartlett served as a campaign manager for his father's re-election campaigns.

Bartlett was elected to the Maryland House of Delegates in November 1998, succeeding J. Anita Stup. He served from January 1999 until January 2011, and opting not to run for re-election in 2010. After leaving office in 2011, he established Bartlett Real Estate Solutions, a real estate firm.

Lodging controversy
In 2010, Bartlett drew criticism for using taxpayer money to pay his girlfriend's rent during the 2008, 2009, and 2010 legislative sessions. In total, the state had paid $31,923 for rent. Bartlett said that he was not dating Katharine Hopkins when he began renting from her in 2008, and that he cleared the housing arrangement with a legislative ethics attorney when the two started dating. The controversy eventually led Bartlett to announce he would not run for re-election to a fourth term on July 6, 2010. In August 2010, Maryland House Speaker Michael E. Busch called for tighter rules on lodging expenses following the controversy.

Personal life
Bartlett is a practicing Christian and lived in Middletown, Maryland, as of the last update to his Vote Smart biography.

Electoral history

References

1969 births
Frostburg State University alumni
Living people
Republican Party members of the Maryland House of Delegates
People from Takoma Park, Maryland
People from Frederick County, Maryland
Businesspeople from Maryland
21st-century American politicians